Wyoming wine refers to wine made from grapes grown in the U.S. state of Wyoming. There are no designated American Viticultural Areas in Wyoming.  The state has two commercial wineries, Table Mountain Vineyards in Huntley and Wyoming Wine in Sheridan. Table Mountain Vineyards is Wyoming's largest with a  vineyard and produced 3,000 gallons in 2007 from 100% Wyoming grapes.  The winery helped pave the way for the Wyoming Grape and Wine Association (WGWA) which focuses on expanding and developing the Wyoming grape industry.  Table Mountain Vineyards has paired up with several wineries in western Nebraska to promote wineries along the historic emigration trails, including the Oregon Trail.

See also
American wine

References

External links
 

Wine regions of the United States by state
Tourism in Wyoming
Agriculture in Wyoming